Yamunacharya (IAST: Yamunāchārya), also known as Alavandar and Yamunaithuraivan, was a Vishistadvaita philosopher based in Srirangam, Tamil Nadu, India. He is best-known for being a preceptor of Ramanuja, one of the leaders of the Sri Vaishnava tradition. He was born in the early 10th century CE, and was the grandson of Nathamuni, a famed yogi, who collected the works of the Tamil Alvars.

Life 

Yamunacharya grew up learning Vedic texts from Rama Misra, and was skilled in the concept of mimamsa. According to Sri Vaishnava tradition, as a teenager, he challenged the royal priest of a Pandya king, Akkiyalvan, to a debate. Akkiyalvan, when he saw the age of the youth, sarcastically asked "Alavandara?", meaning "Has he come to rule me?". He defeated Akkiyalvan by logically proving that Akkiyalvan's mother was barren, the king was not righteous, and the queen unchaste. The king and queen, impressed that the boy had understood the shortcomings of logic, adopted him. The queen hailed the boy as "Alavandar". In other versions of the legend, he is given half the kingdom. There is no historical record to show his reign, so it is possible that this happened in a small village, rather than the kingdom of Pandya.

After years of rule, Rama Misra tricked him into visiting the temple of Ranganatha. There, he had an epiphany, and gave up the material duties of a king and became a sanyasin, embracing the convention of saranagati. He is believed to have composed the Chatushloki and Strotra Ratna at that spot. Rama Misra handed over the reins of Nathamuni's school to him, including the collected Naalayira Divya Prabandham, and offered him the epithet of Yamunacharya.

After the demise of Alavandar, Srirangam was led by the latter's son Thiruvarangan. According to a legend, the deity Ranganatha himself instructed Yamunacharya to go to Kanchipuram and invite Ramanuja to Srirangam. He is also regarded to have received the following instructions:

 The names of Parashara and Veda Vyasa should be commemorated on the earth by giving it to a person worthy to bear it.
 Compose a commentary on Tiruvaymoli of Nammalvar, the most prolific of the Alvars.
 Compose a commentary on Upanishads, Vedanta Sutras, and Bhagavad Gita.

Works

Alavandar, like Ramanuja, focused both on philosophical debates like Dvaita vs. Advaita. The bhakti prayers and the works attributed to him are in Sanskrit, although he codified the heritage of the Tamil Alvars. The works attributed to him are:
 Chatushloki - a popular prayer in praise of Lakshmi
 Stotra Ratnam - a prayer in praise of Narayana
 Siddhitrayam - consisting of (i) Atmasiddhi. (ii) Samvitsiddhi and (iii) Iswarasiddhi which describe the Vishistadvaita school of thought, describing a relation between the soul, God, and the universe
 Agama Pramanya - stating the authority of Pancharatra agama
 Maha Purusha Nirnayam - describing that the ultimate reality  is the god-goddess pair Sri and Narayana
 Gitartha Sangraha - a commentary on the Bhagavad Gita
 Nityam
 Mayavada Khandanam

References

External links

 doctrine of Soul contrasted with those of others, Surendranath Dasgupta, 1940
Kattumannarkoil Temple, Sriman Nathamunigal and Sri Aalavandar life history by Sri U.Ve.Asthagothram Kachi Kidambi T.Sreenivasachari Swamy
Bibliography of Yamuna Acharya's works, Item 580, Karl Potter, University of Washington
The Philosophy of Yāmunācārya, by Surendranath Dasgupta From: A History of Indian Philosophy Volume 3
Works of Yāmunaacharyar - acharya.org

Vaishnavite religious leaders
Translators from Tamil
Vishishtadvaita Vedanta